Semih Kılıçsoy (born 15 August 2005) is a Turkish professional footballer who plays as a forward for the Süper Lig Beşiktaş.

Club career
Kılıçsoy is a youth product of Gop Venüs and Arnavutköy Yaylaspor, before moving to Beşiktaş in 2016. On 21 October 2021, he signed his first professional contract with the club until 2023. He was a prolific goalscorer with their youth sides and reserves. On 23 December 2022, he extended his contract until 2025. He debuted with Beşiktaş as a substitute in a 0–0 Süper Lig tie with Antalyaspor on 26 February 2023.

International career
Kılıçsoy is a youth international for Turkey, having played up to the U19s.

Playing style
Kılıçsoy is a dynamic and talented striker who can also play as a winger or attacking midfielder. He can use both feet well, and is a dynamic and talented striker.

References

External links
 
 

2005 births
Living people
People from Gaziosmanpaşa
Footballers from Istanbul
Turkish footballers
Turkey youth international footballers
Association football forwards
Süper Lig players
Beşiktaş J.K. footballers